Phukphong Phongpetra (RTGS: Phukphong Phongpetra; born 26 July 1961) is a Thai police officer. He is the former Commissioner of the Metropolitan Police Bureau of the Royal Thai Police. Police Lieutenant General Phukphong was appointed to the Commissioner of the Metropolitan Police Bureau on October 1, 2019. He retired on 30 September, 2021, and was succeeded by Samran Nuanma.

Pol. Lt. Gen. Phukphong, known for his leadership skills and expertise in protection and crowd control, played a crucial role in resolving both the 2010 Thai protests and 2020 Thai protests.

Early life and education 
Phukphong was born in Surat Thani on 26 July 1961. Phukphong was brought up in a wealthy family in Surat Thani, known for "for running big businesses including palm oil plantations, a mine and a rock quarry." 

After graduating from Assumption College Siracha, a private, prestigious boarding school for boys in Chonburi province, Phukphong enrolled in the Armed Forces Academies Preparatory School (AFAPS) (Class 22). Later, he continued his education and graduated in the 38th Class at the Royal Police Cadet Academy (RPCA).

Phukphong also graduated from special training abroad, including Tactical Operations Seminar from the Virginia Public Safety Academy in Fairfax, Virginia. In addition, Phukphong is a alumni at the National Defence College of Thailand (Class 59).

Career

Beginnings 
Phukphong began his career as a Deputy Inspector of Investigation at Muang Surat Thani Police Station, his hometown. Later, he was promoted to many ranks in different lines of work in the police form, finally becoming the Deputy Commander at Surat Thani Province in 2008.

Protection and Crowd Control Division 
In 2009, Pol. Lt. Gen. Phukphong was transferred to work on special operations in Southern Thailand, and subsequently was put in charge of the Protection and Crowd Control Division.

After political unrest came to an end in Thailand, Pol. Lt. Gen. Phukphong was promoted to Commissioner of Metropolitan Police Bureau Division 9.

Metropolitan Police Bureau 
In 2014, after the coup d'état that toppled the Pheu Thai-led administration, Pol. Lt. Gen. Phukphong was promoted to Deputy Commissioner of the Metropolitan Police Bureau, under Police General Srivara Rangsibrahmanakul, the Commissioner of the Metropolitan Police Bureau at that time.

Although Pol. Lt. Gen Phukphong gained tremendous experience in maintaining stability and security in Bangkok from the various cases of investigations, the most renowned and notable incident that spurred Phukphong's introduction to the Thai public was his help in investigating the 2015 Bangkok bombing, which took place inside the Erawan Shrine at the Ratchaprasong intersection in Pathum Wan District.

The National Police Policy Committee, on 1 October 2019, appointed Pol. Lt. Gen. Phukphong to be the 50th Commissioner of the Metropolitan Police Bureau, replacing Pol. Lt. Gen. Sutipong Wongpin, who retired on 30 September 2019.

Timeline of Position in the Royal Thai Police

Awards 

  Knight Grand Cordon (Special Class) of The Most Noble Order of the Crown of Thailand
 Knight Grand Cross (First Class) of The Most Exalted Order of the White Elephant
 Chakra Mala Medal

Seminars 

 Participated in "The 14th International Asian Organized Crime Conference" Calgary, Alberta (Canada)
 Participated in "International Criminal Police Organization 62nd General Assembly Session" Aruba
 Participated in "The 16th Annual International Asian Organized Crime Conference" San Francisco, California (United States of America)
 Participated in "The 18th International Asian Organized Crime Conference" Anaheim, California (United States of America)

See also 

 Chakthip Chaijinda 
Srivara Rangsibrahmanakul

References 

1961 births
Living people
Phukphong Phongpetra
Phukphong Phongpetra